The Newcastle upon Tyne Central by-election of 4 November 1976 was held after the resignation of Labour Member of Parliament (MP) Edward Short who left to take up the position of Chairman of Cable & Wireless. Labour held on to the seat in the by-election.

Results

References

1976 elections in the United Kingdom
By-elections to the Parliament of the United Kingdom in North East England constituencies
1976 in England
Elections in Newcastle upon Tyne
20th century in Newcastle upon Tyne
November 1976 events in the United Kingdom